This is a list of publicly accessible passes in the KwaZulu Natal, South Africa.

List of passes in the KwaZulu-Natal province

See also
List of mountain passes of South Africa

References

KwaZulu
Mountain passes of KwaZulu-Natal
Mountain passes of KwaZulu-Natal